Tomasz Podgórski (born 30 December 1985) is a Polish footballer who plays as an attacking midfielder for Piast II Gliwice.

References

External links
 
 

1985 births
Living people
Sportspeople from Gliwice
Polish footballers
Association football midfielders
Ekstraklasa players
Zawisza Bydgoszcz players
Piast Gliwice players
Ruch Chorzów players
Podbeskidzie Bielsko-Biała players